Davagna is a comune (municipality) in the Metropolitan City of Genoa in the Italian region Liguria, located about  northeast of Genoa.  
 
The municipality of Davagna borders the following municipalities: Bargagli, Genoa, Lumarzo, Montoggio and Torriglia.

References

External links

 Official website 

Cities and towns in Liguria